Qual é o Seu Talento? 2 was the second season of Brazilian reality talent show Qual é o Seu Talento?. The season premiered on January 6, 2010 and concluded on June 19, 2010.

André Vasco returned as a host from last season and the judging panel again consists of Thomas Roth, Arnaldo Saccomani, Carlos Eduardo Miranda and Cyz Zamorano.

8-year-old singer Júlia Gomes coming out as the winner, lyrical singer Danillu and acrobatic gymnastics Guaru ESD were the runners-up.

Preliminary auditions
Auditions were held in Belo Horizonte, Juiz de Fora, Sorocaba, Rio de Janeiro and Manaus, but were not televised. Approximately 130 acts advanced to the São Paulo Round.

Semi-finals

During this stage guest judges filled in a special fifth judging seat.

There were six semi-finals, three with seven contestants (Parts 3, 4 & 5) and three with eight contestants (Parts 1, 2 & 8). Judges voted with the same criterion: contestants who took one or more red votes would be automatically eliminated, while contestants who took all green votes would return at the end of the episode for the judges to decide who would go to the final.

Key

Part 1

Part 2

Part 3

Part 4

Part 5

Part 6

Final

The final took place on June 19, 2010 and was a 90-minute special. Each judge had to buzzed out one out of the seven remaining acts until only the final three remaining. 8-year-old singer Júlia Gomes coming out as the winner, while lyrical singer Danillu and acrobatic gymnastics Guaru ESD were the runners-up.

Finalists

Elimination chart

Contestants

Júlia Gomes

Laura Fontana

References

External links
 Qual é o Seu Talento? Official website
 

2010 Brazilian television seasons
Season 02

pt:Qual é o Seu Talento?